Trading the news is a technique to trade equities, currencies and other financial instruments on the financial markets. Trading news releases can be a significant tool for financial investors.  Economic news reports often spur strong short-term moves in the markets, which may create trading opportunities for traders. Announcements about corporate profits, a change in management, rumors of a merger, are events that can cause a company's share price to move wildly up or down. Interest rates, unemployment and export rates, or the central bank's policy shifts, can cause a deep change of an exchange rate.

Methods

Manual
Investors trading shares of a listed company know there are certain events that cause the share price to rise or fall — sudden changes in energy prices, a labor strike at a supplier, a poor month for the sales, for example. Trading the news is the technique of making a profit by trading financial instruments (stock, currency, etc.) just in time, and in accordance to the occurrence of those events.

Automatic
Event-based algorithmic trading, also known as programmed trading, is not a new phenomenon. This trading technique has been increasing in popularity since the early 2000s. As of 2009, studies suggested HFT firms accounted for 60-73% of all US equity trading volume, with that number falling to approximately 50% in 2012. Algorithmic trading allows investors to fine-tune their computers to scan live news feeds and watch for items affecting any listed company.

Social networks in trading the news
Social information is now as powerful as proprietary data feeds. Today social networks are more than just a space to communicate and share ideas, it has become the information source that can rock financial markets to their ground. Twitter alone provides an enormous opportunity for investors and traders:
After Elon Musk tweeted about a new product line Tesla's shares leaped by 4% ($1 billion of its market capitalization);
On August 13, 2013 Carl Icahn tweets about his large stake in Apple Inc. He claims that the company is extremely undervalued and adds that he urges CEO Tim Cook for a larger share buyback. As a result, Apple's shares surged 5% by the end of close on this day.

See also
News Analytics
Stock trader
Trader

References

Share trading